Chukchi , also known as Chukot, is a Chukotko–Kamchatkan language spoken by the Chukchi people in the easternmost extremity of Siberia, mainly in Chukotka Autonomous Okrug. The language is closely related to Koryak. Chukchi, Koryak, Kerek, Alutor, and Itelmen form the Chukotko-Kamchatkan language family. There are many cultural similarities between the Chukchis and Koryaks, including economies based on reindeer herding. Both peoples refer to themselves by the endonym Luorawetlat (ԓыгъоравэтԓьат ; singular Luorawetlan ԓыгъоравэтԓьан ), meaning "the real people". All of these peoples and other unrelated minorities in and around Kamchatka are known collectively as Kamchadals.

Chukchi and Chukchee are anglicized versions of the Russian exonym Chukcha (plural Chukchi). This came into Russian from Čävča, the term used by the Chukchis' Tungusic-speaking neighbors, itself a rendering of the Chukchi word чавчыв , which in Chukchi means "[a man who is] rich in reindeer," referring to any successful reindeer herder, a wealthy man by local standards.

Although Chukchi language is taught in 28 elementary schools in Chukotka Autonomous Region to 1616 children (according to 2015-2016 data), and there are several hours of daily TV and radio broadcasts in the Chuckchi language, the everyday use and proficiency in the language is declining among native Chukchis. According to the 2020 census, 8,526 of the 16,200 Chukchi people speak Chukchi; and most Chukchi now speak Russian (fewer than 100 report not speaking Russian at all). In the UNESCO Red Book, the language is on the list of endangered languages.

Scope 
Many Chukchis use the language as their primary means of communication both within the family and while engaged in their traditional pastoral economic activity (reindeer herding). The language is also used in media (including radio and TV translations) and some business activities. However, Russian is increasingly used as the primary means of business and administrative communication, in addition to behaving as a lingua franca in territories inhabited by non-Chukchis such as Koryaks and Yakuts. Over the past few decades, fewer and fewer Chukchi children have been learning Chukchi as a native language. Almost all Chukchis speak Russian, although some have a lesser command than others. Chukchi language is used as a primary language of instruction in elementary school; the rest of secondary education is done in Russian with Chukchi taught as a subject.

A Chukchi writer, Yuri Rytkheu (1930–2008), has earned a measure of renown in both Russia and Western Europe, although much of his published work was written in Russian, rather than Chukchi. Chukchi poet Antonina Kymytval wrote in her native language.

Orthography 

Until 1931, the Chukchi language had no official orthography, in spite of attempts in the 1800s to write religious texts in it.

At the beginning of the 1900s, Vladimir Bogoraz discovered specimens of pictographic writing by the Chukchi herdsman Tenevil (see :ru:File:Luoravetl.jpg). Tenevil's writing system was his own invention, and was never used beyond his camp. The first official Chukchi alphabet was devised by Bogoraz in 1931 and was based on the Latin script:

In 1937, this alphabet, along with all of the other alphabets of the non-Slavic peoples of the USSR, was replaced by a Cyrillic alphabet. At first it was the Russian alphabet with the addition of the digraphs К’ к’ and Н’ н’. In the 1950s the additional letters were replaced by Ӄ ӄ and Ӈ ӈ. These newer letters were mainly used in educational texts, while the press continued to use the older versions. At the end of the 1980s, the letter Ԓ ԓ was introduced as a replacement for Л л. This was intended to reduce confusion with the pronunciation of the Russian letter of the same form. The Chukchi alphabet now stands as follows:

Romanization of Chukchi 
The romanization of Chukchi is the representation of the Chukchi language using Latin letters.

The following is the ISO 9 system of Romanization:

Phonology 

 [ɸ, x, ɻ̊, j̊] are heard as allophones of /β, ɣ, ɻ, j/ after voiceless stops.
 /ɻ/ is mostly heard as an alveolar trill [r], when in between vowels.
 /s/ is phonetically [s~t͡ʃ] in free variation and only occurs in the men's dialect.
 /t͡ʃ/ becomes [s] before /q/ and only occurs in the women's dialect.
 /s/, /t͡ʃ/ and /ɻ/ have different distributions between men's and women's dialects.

There are no voiced stops in the language; these are only found in loanwords.

The second group is known as "dominant vowels" and the first group as "recessive vowels"; that is because whenever a "dominant" vowel is present anywhere in a word, all "recessive" vowels in the word change into their "dominant" counterpart. The schwa vowel  does not alternate but may trigger harmony as if it belonged to the dominant group.

Initial and final consonant clusters are not tolerated, and schwa epenthesis is pervasive.

Stress tends to: 1. be penultimate; 2. stay within the stem; 3. avoid schwas.

Grammar 
Chukchi is a largely polysynthetic, agglutinative, direct-inverse language and has ergative–absolutive alignment. It also has very pervasive incorporation. In particular, the incorporation is productive and often interacts with other linguistic processes. Chukchi allows free incorporation of adjuncts, such as when a noun incorporates its modifier. However, besides the unusual use of adjuncts, Chukchi behaves in a very normal linguistic manner. The language of Chukchi also uses a specific verb system. The basic locative construction of a sentence in Chukchi contains a single locative verb, unlike many other languages.

In the nominals, there are two numbers and about 13 morphological cases: absolutive, ergative/instrumental, equative (copula), locative, allative, ablative, orientative, inessive, perlative, sublative, comitative, associative, and privative. Nouns are split into three declensions influenced by animacy: the first declension, which contains non-humans, has plural marking only in the absolutive case; the second one, which contains personal names and certain words for mainly older relatives, has obligatory plural marking in all forms; the third one, which contains other humans than those in the second declension, has optional plural marking. These nominal cases are used to identify the number of nouns, as well as their purpose and function in a sentence.

Verbs distinguish three persons, two numbers, three moods (declarative, imperative and conditional), two voices (active and antipassive) and six tenses: present I (progressive), present II (stative), past I (aorist), past II (perfect), future I (perfective future), future II (imperfective future). Past II is formed with a construction meaning possession (literally "to be with"), similar to the use of "have" in the perfect in English and other Western European languages.

Both subject and direct object are cross-referenced in the verbal chain, and person agreement is very different in intransitive and transitive verbs. Person agreement is expressed with a complex system involving both prefixes and suffixes; despite the agglutinative nature of the language, each individual combination of person, number, tense etc. is expressed in a way that is far from always straightforward. Besides the finite forms, there are also infinitive, supine (purposive), numerous gerund forms, and a present and past participle, and these are all used with auxiliary verbs to produce further analytic constructions.

The word order is rather free, though SOV is basic. The possessor normally precedes the possessed, and postpositions rather than prepositions are used.

Chukchi as a language often proves difficult to categorize. This is primarily due to the fact that it does not always follow a typical linguistic and syntactical pattern. These exceptions allow Chukchi to fit into more than one linguistic type.

Numbers
The numeral system was originally purely vigesimal and went up to 400, but a decimal system was introduced for numerals above 100 via Russian influence. Many of the names of the basic numbers can be traced etymologically to words referring to the human body ("finger", "hand" etc.) or to arithmetic operations (6 = "1 + 5" etc.).

Ordinary numbers are formed with the suffix -ӄeв/-ӄaв. -ӄeв is after close vowels, and -ӄaв is after open vowels.

Vocabulary 
A large number of words in the Chukchi language are reduplicated in their singular forms, i.e. Chukchi Э’ръэр ("iceberg") and Утуут ("tree"). There is also significant influence from the Russian language, especially in formal vocabulary and modern concepts, i.e. Chukchi Чайпат, from Russian Чай (tea). The extent to which Chukchi and the Eskimo languages borrowed vocabulary between one another, or a relationship between the two, has not been studied in detail.

People 
The Chukchi people have a rich history and culture, which have traditionally centered around war. The Chukchi prize warriors and the fighting spirit that they embody. This emphasis on conflict can be seen in the interactions between the Chukchi and the Russians, which date back to the middle of the seventeenth century and tell of glorious battles between the two groups. The Chukchi have also been known to battle nearby tribes, particularly the Tánñit, which comprise fellow Siberian peoples known as the Koryaks. However, over the last century, the Chukchi people have engaged in far fewer conflicts and have focused more on trading. Today, the Chukchi economy relies heavily on trade, particularly with Russia.

Besides trading with Russia, the Chukchi make their living off of herding reindeer and bartering with other tribes. There is also a group of Chukchi that do not herd reindeer and instead live along the coast, trading more with tribes who live along the pacific coast. Some Chukchi people even choose to go back and forth between the two divisions, trading with both. These people tend to control more of the trade and have been called Kavrálît or “Rangers”.

Noteworthy, Chukchi men and women use different pronunciation for the same words. While men say "r" or "rk", women say  "ts" or "tsts" is the same word.

External influence 
The external influences of Chukchi have not been well-studied. In particular, the degree of contacts between the Chukchi and Eskimo languages remains an open question. Research into this area is problematic in part because of the lack of written evidence. (Cf. de Reuse in the Bibliography.) Contact influence of Russian, which is increasing, consists of word borrowing and pressure on surface syntax; the latter is primarily seen in written communication (translated texts) and is not apparent in day-to-day speech.

References

Bibliography

 Alevtina N. Zhukova, Tokusu Kurebito,"A Basic Topical Dictionary of the Koryak-Chukchi Languages (Asian and African Lexicon Series, 46)",ILCAA, Tokyo Univ. of Foreign Studies (2004), 

Bogoras, W., 1922. "Chukchee". In Handbook of American Indian Languages II, ed. F. Boas, Washington, D.C.
Comrie, B., 1981. The Languages of the Soviet Union, Cambridge: Cambridge University Press (Cambridge Language Surveys).
De Reuse, Willem Joseph, 1994. Siberian Yupik Eskimo: The Language and Its Contacts with Chukchi, Univ. of Utah Press, 
Dunn, Michael John (1999). A Grammar of Chukchi (PhD Thesis). Australian National University.
Dunn, Michael, 2000. "Chukchi Women's Language: A Historical-Comparative Perspective", Anthropological Linguistics, Vol. 42, No. 3 (Fall, 2000), pp. 305–328
Kolga, M. (2001). The Red Book of the Peoples of the Russian Empire. Tallinn: NGO Red Book.
Krause, Scott R. (1980). Topics in Chukchee Phonology and Morphology. Ann Arbor: UMI.
Nedjalkov, V. P., 1976. "Diathesen und Satzstruktur im Tschuktschischen" [in German]. In: Ronald Lötzsch (ed.), Satzstruktur und Genus verbi (Studia Grammatica 13). Berlin: Akademie-Verlag, pp. 181–211.

Skorik, P[etr] Ja., 1961. Grammatika čukotskogo jazyka 1: Fonetika i morfologija imennych častej reči (Grammar of the Chukchi Language: Phonetics and morphology of the nominal parts of speech) [in Russian]. Leningrad: Nauka.
Skorik, P[etr] Ja., 1977. Grammatika čukotskogo jazyka 2: Glagol, narečie, služebnye slova (Grammar of the Chuckchi Language: Verb, adverb, function words) [in Russian]. Leningrad: Nauka:
Weinstein, Charles, 2010. Parlons tchouktche [in French]. Paris: L'Harmattan.

External links 

 
 
 Endangered Languages of Siberia – The Chukchi language
 Russian-Chukchi Phrasebook
 Chukchi fairy tales in Chukchi and English
 The Gospel of Luke in Chukchi 
 A Chukchi language appendix to the newspaper "Krayny Sever"
 Population by mother tongue and districts in 50 Governorates of the European Russia in 1897
 
 Volodin, A. P. and P. Ja. Skorik (1997). "Čukotskyj jazyk" (The Chukchi language) [in Russian]. In: Jazyki mira: Paleoaziatskije jazyki (Languages of the World: Paleoasiatic Languages), Moskva: Indrik, p. 23-39; online: 
 Skorik, P. J. (1961/1977). Grammatika čukotskogo jazyka (Grammar of the Chukchi Language) [in Russian]. Vol. 1/2. Leningrad: Nauka

Chukchi culture
Chukchi people
Chukotko-Kamchatkan languages
Languages of Russia
Agglutinative languages
Polysynthetic languages
Vowel-harmony languages